Shareshill is a village and civil parish in the South Staffordshire district, in the county of Staffordshire, England. The population as measured in the 2011 census was 759. The parish church is dedicated to St Mary and St Luke, Shareshill.

Shareshill in 1851
In 1851, Shareshill had 594 inhabitants and 4200 acres of land including 11 farmers, 2 maltsters, a wheelwright, a dressmaker, 2 shopkeepers, 3 shoemakers, 1 butcher, 2 beerhouses (the Horse & Jockey and The Swan), 2 gentlemen and a schoolmistress. Lord Hatherton was lord of the manor, although some land was also owned by Major General Henry Charles W Vernon of nearby Hilton Park Hall, and onetime High Sheriff of Staffordshire, the Rev J L Petit and Alexander Hordern, Esq. Bordering the village are two rectangular archaeological vestiges of possibly Roman encampments. In the time of Henry IV, Shareshill was the seat of Sir William de Shareshill, who was also Sheriff of the county. The church has a reputedly very ancient tower and contains several curious antique monuments.

See also
Listed buildings in Shareshill

References

External links 

 http://www.shares.f9.co.uk/history.html
 http://www.shares.f9.co.uk/
 Listed buildings in Shareshill
 http://www.british-history.ac.uk/report.aspx?compid=53409

Villages in Staffordshire
Civil parishes in Staffordshire